

Crown
Head of State - Queen Elizabeth II

Federal government
Governor General - Edward Schreyer

Cabinet
Prime Minister -  Pierre Trudeau
Deputy Prime Minister - Allan MacEachen
Minister of Finance - Allan MacEachen then Marc Lalonde
Secretary of State for External Affairs - Mark MacGuigan then Allan MacEachen
Secretary of State for Canada - Gerald Regan then Serge Joyal
Minister of National Defence - Gilles Lamontagne
Minister of National Health and Welfare - Monique Bégin
Minister of Regional Economic Expansion - Pierre De Bané then Herb Gray then Ed Lumley renamed Minister of Regional Industrial Expansion on December 7
Minister of the Environment - John Roberts
Minister of Justice - Jean Chrétien then Mark MacGuigan
Minister of Transport - Jean-Luc Pépin
Minister of Communications - Francis Fox
Minister of Fisheries and Oceans - Roméo LeBlanc then Pierre de Bané
Minister of Agriculture - Eugene Whelan
Minister of Public Works - Paul James Cosgrove then Roméo LeBlanc
Minister of Employment and Immigration - Lloyd Axworthy
Minister of Indian Affairs and Northern Development - John Munro
Minister of Energy, Mines and Resources - John Roberts

Parliament
See: 32nd Canadian parliament

Party leaders
Liberal Party of Canada - Pierre Trudeau
New Democratic Party- Ed Broadbent
Progressive Conservative Party of Canada - Joe Clark

Supreme Court Justices
Chief Justice: Bora Laskin
William McIntyre
Ronald Martland then Bertha Wilson
Antonio Lamer
Roland Almon Ritchie
Jean Beetz
Julien Chouinard
Gerald Eric Le Dain

Other
Speaker of the House of Commons - Jeanne Sauvé
Governor of the Bank of Canada - Gerald Bouey
Chief of the Defence Staff - Air General R.M. Withers.

Provinces

Premiers
Premier of Alberta - Peter Lougheed
Premier of British Columbia - Bill Bennett
Premier of Manitoba - Howard Pawley
Premier of New Brunswick - Richard Hatfield
Premier of Newfoundland - Brian Peckford
Premier of Nova Scotia - John Buchanan
Premier of Ontario - Bill Davis
Premier of Prince Edward Island - James Lee
Premier of Quebec - René Lévesque
Premier of Saskatchewan - Allan Blakeney then Grant Devine

Lieutenant-governors
Lieutenant-Governor of Alberta - Frank C. Lynch-Staunton
Lieutenant-Governor of British Columbia - Henry Pybus Bell-Irving
Lieutenant-Governor of Manitoba - Pearl McGonigal
Lieutenant-Governor of New Brunswick - George F.G. Stanley
Lieutenant-Governor of Newfoundland and Labrador - William Anthony Paddon
Lieutenant-Governor of Nova Scotia - John Elvin Shaffner
Lieutenant-Governor of Ontario - Jean-Pierre Côté
Lieutenant-Governor of Prince Edward Island - Joseph Aubin Doiron
Lieutenant-Governor of Quebec - Gilles Lamontagne
Lieutenant-Governor of Saskatchewan - Irwin McIntosh

Mayors
Toronto - Art Eggleton
Montreal - Jean Drapeau
Vancouver - Michael Harcourt
Ottawa - Marion Dewar

Religious leaders
Roman Catholic Bishop of Quebec - Cardinal Archbishop Louis-Albert Vachon
Roman Catholic Bishop of Montreal -  Cardinal Archbishop Paul Grégoire
Roman Catholic Bishops of London - Bishop John Michael Sherlock
Moderator of the United Church of Canada - Lois M. Wilson then W. Clarke MacDonald

See also
1981 Canadian incumbents
Events in Canada in 1982
1983 Canadian incumbents
 Governmental leaders in 1982
 Canadian incumbents by year

1982
Incumbents
Canadian leaders